Kissin may refer to:

 Kissing, the physically affectionate act of a kiss
 Evgeny Kissin (born 1971), a Russian classical pianist
 Joel Kissin, a British restaurateur
 Kissin, Syria, a village in central Syria
 KIZN, branded as Kissin' 92, a radio station in Boise, Idaho

See also
 Kiss (disambiguation)